Ian David Lithgow (born February 3, 1972) is an American actor. He is best known for his work as Leon in the NBC series 3rd Rock from the Sun (1996–2001). He is the son of actor John Lithgow.

Biography 
Lithgow was born on February 3, 1972, in Cambridge, Massachusetts, the son and only child from the marriage of actor John Lithgow and his first wife, Jean Taynton. He has two half siblings, Phoebe (born 1982) and Nathan (born 1983). He received his undergraduate degree from Harvard University and his M.A. in Clinical Psychology from Antioch University Los Angeles. He currently runs a practice in Lower Manhattan specializing in marriage and family therapy.

Lithgow is an actor who has performed in film, television, and in regional theatres across the country, including the Goodman Theatre, the American Repertory Theatre, the Williamstown Theatre Festival, the Ahmanson Theatre, and the Pasadena Playhouse. He created the role of Tony in Boy Gets Girl, which he performed at the Manhattan Theatre Club. In the 1990s NBC sitcom 3rd Rock from the Sun, Lithgow portrayed the recurring role of Leon, a purportedly dim-witted student who attends the physics class of Dick Solomon (portrayed by real-life father John Lithgow). He portrayed a son of his father's character in the 2020 HBO television series Perry Mason.

Filmography

References

External links
 
 

1972 births
Living people
20th-century American male actors
21st-century American male actors
American male film actors
American male television actors
American people of Dominican Republic descent
American people of English descent
American people of French descent
American people of Scottish descent
21st-century American psychologists
Antioch University alumni
Harvard University alumni